Eastcheap is a street in central London that is a western continuation of Great Tower Street towards Monument junction. Its name derives from cheap, the Old English word for market, with the prefix 'East' distinguishing it from Westcheap, another former market street that today is called Cheapside.

In medieval times, Eastcheap was the main meat market in the City of London, with butchers' stalls lining both sides of the street. It is also notable as the former location of Falstaff's Boar's Head Inn, featured in William Shakespeare's Henry IV, Part 1 and Henry IV, Part 2.

History

The history of Eastcheap dates back to Anglo-Saxon times. The name is first attested on an Anglo-Saxon penny of King Harold I (reigned 1035–1040) that was minted in London by the moneyer Eadwold between 1035 and 1037. The mint signature on the coin reads "EADǷOLD ONESTCEPLV" which is interpreted as "Eadwold on Estcep Lu[ndene]", meaning "Eadwold, on East Cheap, London". It is believed that this is the earliest known instance of a street-name on Anglo-Saxon coinage.

At its western end, the modern Eastcheap begins at Monument junction where Gracechurch Street, Cannon Street, and King William Street converge by Monument tube station. It continues eastward into Great Tower Street. It lies within the City ward of Bridge.

The street formerly extended further to the west, where it was called Great Eastcheap, but this section was eliminated when King William Street was built to provide new access to London Bridge in the early 19th century. Falstaff's famed tavern, which stood on the Great Eastcheap section of the road, was demolished at this time. The old eastern portion and what is today's Eastcheap, was known as Little Eastcheap.

The erased western portion of Eastcheap is recalled in the name of the church of St. Clement Eastcheap, which, despite its name, is to the north of King William Street and to the west of present-day Eastcheap.

Eastcheap formed part of the marathon course of the 2012 Olympic and Paralympic Games. The women's Olympic marathon took place on 5 August and the men's on 12 August. The Paralympic marathons were held on 9 September.

Notable structures
On Eastcheap's north side is St. Margaret Pattens' church at the corner with Rood Lane. All Hallows-by-the-Tower is visible looking east down Eastcheap and  Great Tower Street. On the south side, in the side-road Lovat Lane, is St. Mary-at-Hill. Also on the south side is Botolph Lane, where a Christopher Wren church, St. George, Botolph Lane, stood until it was demolished in 1904. West of Botolph Lane is Pudding Lane, where the Great Fire of London was started.

At 16 Eastcheap is the Monument branch of Citibank; this was the site of St. Andrew Hubbard church, where the economist Thomas Mun was baptised, but the structure was later destroyed by the Great Fire. It was replaced by the King's Weigh House where foreign merchants were required to weigh their goods, although the law was not strictly enforced. In 1695 it became a chapel for dissenters. In 1834 they moved to larger premises in Fish Street Hill, at the western end of Eastcheap, now occupied by an exit of the modern Monument tube station. In 1891, Alfred Waterhouse built another Weigh House church, on Duke Street. The building was deemed so magnificent that nearby Robert Street was renamed Weighhouse Street in its honour. During excavation of the site the foundations had stones that had the character of Roman workmanship, and Samian pottery was discovered.

On the Philpot Lane side of 23 Eastcheap is one of London's smallest statues, of two mice eating or fighting over a piece of cheese. The statue's exact origin is unclear but it is thought to date from 1862 and was possibly made for the spice merchants Hunt and Crombie by John Young & Son. Another theory surrounding its existence is that it commemorates an incident where an argument broke out between two construction workers when one accused the other of eating some of his lunch, and during the ensuing altercation one of the men fell from the building to his death. It was later found that mice were the culprits responsible for the missing food.

The building at 33-35 Eastcheap is a notable example of Victorian Gothic architecture.

References 

 Smith, A. (1970) Dictionary of City of London Street Names. David and Charles: Newton Abbot.

External links

Photographs of the area
Weigh House church in Duke Street
1773 description of Eastcheap
Illustration of the Eastcheap Weigh House
History of the Weigh House church
Samian pottery

Streets in the City of London